Andinentulus is a genus of proturans in the family Acerentomidae.

Species
 Andinentulus ebbei Tuxen, 1984

References

Protura